The Hansa-Brandenburg W.18 was a single-seat German fighter flying boat of World War I. It was used by both the Kaiserliche Marine (Imperial German Navy) and the Austro-Hungarian Navy.

Development and design 
The Hansa-Brandenburg W.18 during 1916 for use by the Austro-Hungarian Navy. It was a single engined, single seater flying boat, with a Hiero 6 pusher engine mounted between the wings. It had single-bay wings, with the unusual "Star-Strutter" arrangement of bracing struts (where four Vee struts joined in the center of the wing bay to result in a "star" arrangement) shared with the Hansa-Brandenburg D.I, Hansa-Brandenburg CC, and Hansa-Brandenburg KDW.

Operational history 
Austro-Hungary received 47 Hansa Brandenburg W.18 aircraft, from September 1917 to May 1918, using them to provide air-defence for ports and naval bases along the Adriatic sea coast. One Benz-engine example was delivered to the Imperial German Navy.

Operators 

Kaiserliche und Königliche Kriegsmarine

Kaiserliche Marine

Specifications (W.18 - Benz engine)

See also

References

Bibliography

External links 

 Hansa-Brandenburg CC und W.18

W.18
1910s German fighter aircraft
Flying boats
Biplanes
Single-engined pusher aircraft
Aircraft first flown in 1917